The 1978–79 Algerian Championnat National was the 17th season of the Algerian Championnat National since its establishment in 1962. A total of 14 teams contested the league, with MP Alger as the defending champions, The Championnat started on September 8, 1978. and ended on June 8, 1979.

Team summaries

Promotion and relegation 
Teams promoted from Algerian Division 2 1978-1979 
 GCR Mascara
 ESM Guelma
 IR Saha

Teams relegated to Algerian Division 2 1979-1980
 CM Constantine

League table

References

External links
1978–79 Algerian Championnat National

Algerian Ligue Professionnelle 1 seasons
1978–79 in Algerian football
Algeria